The Organisation Commission of the Lao People's Revolutionary Party Central Committee was established on 25 March 1955. It is responsible for organising and leading the party's organisation and personnel work.

The Head of the Central Committee Organisation Commission is by right of office member of the LPRP Central Committee. The current head, Sisay Leudetmounsone, is a member of the 11th Central Committee, 11th Politburo and the 11th Secretariat.

Heads

References

External links
 Website

Central Committee apparatus of the Lao People's Revolutionary Party
1955 establishments in Laos